Mullanacre may refer to the following places in the Republic of  Ireland:

Mullanacre Lower
Mullanacre Upper